Darryl Wakelin (born 11 August 1974) is a former Australian rules footballer who played for St Kilda and Port Adelaide in the Australian Football League as a defender.

AFL career

Adelaide
Wakelin was selected by Adelaide with the 11th pick in the 1993 Pre-Season draft. After 2 seasons on their list he didn't play a senior game and was delisted at the end of 1994.

St Kilda
In 1994 he played in a premiership with the Magpies league team, winning the Jack Oatey Medal for best afield in the absence of his twin brother, Shane, who had already left for St Kilda. Wakelin was the first player from the "key defensive" positions of centre half-back or full-back to win the award. In 1995, Darryl left the club to join his brother at St Kilda. He played his first game in Round 1 of the 1995 season. His career started superbly with the Saints, averaging 10 disposals in his first season.

Wakelin played in St Kilda’s 1996 AFL Ansett Australia Cup winning side – the club's first AFL Cup win.

Wakelin played in 17 of 22 matches in the 1997 AFL Premiership Season home and away rounds in which St Kilda Football Club qualified in first position for the 1997 AFL Finals Series, winning the club’s 2nd Minor Premiership and 1st McClelland Trophy.

By the end of the 2000 season, the Saints were looking for younger players and Wakelin was traded to Port Adelaide for the fourth selection in the 2000 National Draft (which was then on-traded to Carlton as part of a deal for Aaron Hamill). In total, he played 115 games for St Kilda, kicking just 8 goals.

Port Adelaide
In 2001 he joined the Port Adelaide without his twin brother, Shane, who moved to Collingwood. In 2004 he won a premiership with Port Adelaide after his brother had lost in the two previous Grand Finals. During 2005 the Wakelin Brothers became the most capped pair of twin brothers overtaking Steven Febey and Matthew Febey. In Round 12 of 2006, he picked up a career high 22 disposals against West Coast. In round 5, 2007, Darryl played his 250th game. On 29 August 2007 he announced his retirement from AFL at the season end, which in fact concluded for him as part of the 2007 Port Grand Final team.

Personal life
Wakelin's identical twin Shane Wakelin played alongside him at St Kilda. Wakelin was born on 11 August 1974. Shane was born on 12 August as he was born a number of minutes after midnight and Darryl was a born a number of minutes before midnight. He was born in Whyalla, South Australia but moved to Kimba, South Australia at just six months old. His father was a wheat sheep farmer. He was 13 when he moved to Port Lincoln, South Australia. At 16 he was identified by Port Adelaide along with his twin brother and they made the move down to Adelaide.

Throughout his AFL Career, Daryl was known as one of the best fullbacks in the competition along with his brother Shane.

Playing statistics

|-
|- style="background-color: #EAEAEA"
! scope="row" style="text-align:center" | 1995
|style="text-align:center;"|
| 15 || 21 || 0 || 1 || 146 || 66 || 212 || 61 || 30 || 0.0 || 0.0 || 7.0 || 3.1 || 10.1 || 2.9 || 1.4
|-
! scope="row" style="text-align:center" | 1996
|style="text-align:center;"|
| 15 || 15 || 2 || 0 || 58 || 33 || 91 || 31 || 17 || 0.1 || 0.0 || 3.9 || 2.2 || 6.1 || 2.1 || 1.1
|- style="background-color: #EAEAEA"
! scope="row" style="text-align:center" | 1997
|style="text-align:center;"|
| 15 || 20 || 4 || 2 || 71 || 56 || 127 || 38 || 24 || 0.2 || 0.1 || 3.6 || 2.8 || 6.4 || 1.9 || 1.2
|-
! scope="row" style="text-align:center" | 1998
|style="text-align:center;"|
| 15 || 22 || 1 || 2 || 121 || 80 || 201 || 73 || 28 || 0.0 || 0.1 || 5.5 || 3.6 || 9.1 || 3.3 || 1.3
|- style="background-color: #EAEAEA"
! scope="row" style="text-align:center" | 1999
|style="text-align:center;"|
| 15 || 19 || 1 || 2 || 116 || 60 || 176 || 83 || 13 || 0.1 || 0.1 || 6.1 || 3.2 || 9.3 || 4.4 || 0.7
|-
! scope="row" style="text-align:center" | 2000
|style="text-align:center;"|
| 15 || 18 || 0 || 3 || 103 || 63 || 166 || 78 || 16 || 0.0 || 0.2 || 5.7 || 3.5 || 9.2 || 4.3 || 0.9
|- style="background-color: #EAEAEA"
! scope="row" style="text-align:center" | 2001
|style="text-align:center;"|
| 2 || 23 || 1 || 1 || 94 || 75 || 169 || 64 || 32 || 0.0 || 0.0 || 4.1 || 3.3 || 7.3 || 2.8 || 1.4
|-
! scope="row" style="text-align:center" | 2002
|style="text-align:center;"|
| 2 || 21 || 2 || 0 || 96 || 86 || 182 || 89 || 31 || 0.1 || 0.0 || 4.6 || 4.1 || 8.7 || 4.2 || 1.5
|- style="background-color: #EAEAEA"
! scope="row" style="text-align:center" | 2003
|style="text-align:center;"|
| 2 || 20 || 0 || 1 || 129 || 57 || 186 || 101 || 25 || 0.0 || 0.1 || 6.5 || 2.9 || 9.3 || 5.1 || 1.3
|-
! scope="row" style="text-align:center;" | 2004
|style="text-align:center;"|
| 2 || 23 || 1 || 0 || 122 || 92 || 214 || 104 || 27 || 0.0 || 0.0 || 5.3 || 4.0 || 9.3 || 4.5 || 1.2
|- style="background-color: #EAEAEA"
! scope="row" style="text-align:center" | 2005
|style="text-align:center;"|
| 2 || 24 || 0 || 0 || 149 || 106 || 255 || 134 || 27 || 0.0 || 0.0 || 6.2 || 4.4 || 10.6 || 5.6 || 1.1
|-
! scope="row" style="text-align:center" | 2006
|style="text-align:center;"|
| 2 || 20 || 0 || 1 || 164 || 90 || 254 || 130 || 11 || 0.0 || 0.1 || 8.2 || 4.5 || 12.7 || 6.5 || 0.6
|- style="background-color: #EAEAEA"
! scope="row" style="text-align:center" | 2007
|style="text-align:center;"|
| 2 || 15 || 0 || 0 || 112 || 59 || 171 || 80 || 21 || 0.0 || 0.0 || 7.5 || 3.9 || 11.4 || 5.3 || 1.4
|- class="sortbottom"
! colspan=3| Career
! 261
! 12
! 13
! 1481
! 923
! 2404
! 1066
! 302
! 0.0
! 0.0
! 5.7
! 3.5
! 9.2
! 4.1
! 1.2
|}

Trivia
Wakelin has a pharmacy degree from the University of South Australia and runs a pharmacy in Alberton South Australia.

See also
1994 SANFL Grand Final

References

External links

1974 births
Living people
Port Adelaide Magpies players
Port Adelaide Football Club players
Port Adelaide Football Club Premiership players
Port Adelaide Football Club players (all competitions)
St Kilda Football Club players
South Australian State of Origin players
Australian rules footballers from South Australia
Port Adelaide Football Club (SANFL) players
Australian twins
Twin sportspeople
Identical twins
One-time VFL/AFL Premiership players
People from Whyalla